The British Swimming Championships - 50 metres breaststroke winners formerly the (Amateur Swimming Association (ASA) National Championships) are listed below.

The event first appeared at the 1991 Championships.

50 metres breaststroke champions

See also
British Swimming
List of British Swimming Championships champions

References

Swimming in the United Kingdom